This list of RNA structure prediction software is a compilation of software tools and web portals used for RNA structure prediction.

Single sequence secondary structure prediction.

Single sequence tertiary structure prediction

Comparative methods
The single sequence methods mentioned above have a difficult job detecting a small sample of reasonable secondary structures from a large space of possible structures. A good way to reduce the size of the space is to use evolutionary approaches. Structures that have been conserved by evolution are far more likely to be the functional form. The methods below use this approach.

RNA solvent accessibility prediction

Intermolecular interactions: RNA-RNA
Many ncRNAs function by binding to other RNAs. For example, miRNAs regulate protein coding gene expression by binding to 3' UTRs, small nucleolar RNAs guide post-transcriptional modifications by binding to rRNA, U4 spliceosomal RNA and U6 spliceosomal RNA bind to each other forming part of the spliceosome and many small bacterial RNAs regulate gene expression by antisense interactions E.g. GcvB, OxyS and RyhB.

Intermolecular interactions: MicroRNA:any RNA
The below table includes interactions that are not limited to UTRs.

Intermolecular interactions: MicroRNA:UTR
MicroRNAs regulate protein coding gene expression by binding to 3' UTRs, there are tools specifically designed for predicting these interactions. For an evaluation of target prediction methods on high-throughput experimental data see (Baek et al., Nature 2008), (Alexiou et al., Bioinformatics 2009), or (Ritchie et al., Nature Methods 2009)

ncRNA gene prediction software

Family specific gene prediction software

RNA homology search software

Benchmarks

Alignment viewers, editors

Inverse folding, RNA design

Notes

Secondary structure viewers, editors

See also 
 RNA
 Non-coding RNA
 RNA structure
 Comparison of nucleic acid simulation software
 Comparison of software for molecular mechanics modeling

References 

RNA structure
RNA structure prediction software
RNA
Structural bioinformatics software